The Guatemala national football team represents Guatemala in men's international football and is controlled by the Federación Nacional de Fútbol de Guatemala. Founded in 1919, it has been affiliated to FIFA since 1946, and it is a member of CONCACAF.

The team has made three Olympic tournament appearances, competing at the 1968, 1976, and 1988 Olympic Games. Guatemala have never qualified for the finals tournament of the World Cup, although they have reached the final round of qualification on four occasions.

Guatemala won the 1967 CONCACAF Championship and the 2001 UNCAF Nations Cup. The team's best performance in a CONCACAF Gold Cup was in 1996, when they finished fourth. Guatemala has also earned a bronze medal at the 1983 Pan American Games in Caracas, Venezuela. The national team kits are supplied by Umbro. Past kit suppliers include Atletica, Adidas and Puma.

History

Beginnings
Guatemala created its first soccer team, made up of 22 players, on 23 August 1902. The team was split into two sides, blue and white. With time, clubs were made and eventually the Guatemalan national team, nicknamed "la Azul y Blanco" (the blue and white), was created in 1921. Guatemala had its first game on 16 September 1921, in the Independence Centenary Games held in Guatemala City, against Honduras. The game was played in Guatemala City and Guatemala beat Honduras 9–0. In the final, Guatemala were defeated 6–0 by Costa Rica.

Guatemala had success in several editions of the CCCF Championship, the precursor of the Gold Cup, by being the runners-up in 1943, 1946, and 1948. In 1958, Guatemala began participating in the qualifying rounds of the World Cup. They finished last, without a point, in a group with Costa Rica and the Netherlands Antilles.

Success in the 1960s
Guatemala's performance in the World Cup qualifying rounds began to improve in the 1960s. In 1962 they drew against both Costa Rica (4–4) and Honduras (1–1). However they again finished last in their qualifying group.

Guatemala did not participate in the qualifying round in 1966, as FIFA refused their participation for administrative reasons.

Guatemala joined CONCACAF in 1961. In 1967, they again showed the progress they had made when by participating by winning the Gold Cup for the only time in their history. In that tournament, hosted by Honduras, Guatemala began with a 2–1 win against Haiti, followed by a 1–0 win over the defending champions, Mexico, a 0–0 draw against Honduras, a 2–0 win over Trinidad and Tobago, and a 2–0 win over Nicaragua. The forward Manuel "Escopeta" Recinos was Guatemala's top scorer with four goals, including the goal against Mexico.

Guatemala were also the runners-up in the CONCACAF Championship in 1965 and 1969.

Results

In 1967, Guatemala showed further progress by qualifying for the 1968 Olympic football tournament in Mexico City. In the first round, they won 1–0 against Czechoslovakia, and 4–1 against Thailand, and lost to Bulgaria 2–1. They went on the next round, where they lost 1–0 to the eventual champions, Hungary.

2006 World Cup
Before the 2006 World Cup qualifiers, many fans saw Carlos Ruiz as the main focus in providing goals for the national team along with Juan Carlos Plata. Many other stars such as Fredy Garcia, Gonzalo Romero, Guillermo Ramirez, and Martin Machón were expected to play huge roles as well. In the 2006 World Cup qualifying, Guatemala advanced to the third round by beating Suriname 4–2. There they finished second in Group B, behind Costa Rica, with 10 points each. In the fourth round they started with a 0–0 draw against Panama and a 5–1 win against Trinidad and Tobago. Then followed a 2–0 loss against the United States and Mexico and a 3–2 loss against Costa Rica, and a 2–1 win against Panama. They lost against Trinidad and Tobago 3–2, drew against the United States 0–0 and then lost to Mexico 5–2. Guatemala had 8 points with one game left, and a win alongside a Trinidad and Tobago defeat against Mexico would send them into the play-offs. They won 3–1 against Costa Rica but Trinidad and Tobago beat Mexico 2–1. They finished in fifth place, two points away from the play-off spot. Juan Carlos Plata and Martin Machón announced their retirement from International Football in 2006.

2010 World Cup
After a third-place finish at the 2007 UNCAF Nations Cup, and reaching the knockout stage in the Gold Cup of the same year, along with a couple of satisfying friendly matches, including a 3–2 win against Mexico, many saw Hernán Darío Gómez as the next coach to lead Guatemala into the Hexagonal in the World Cup qualifying stage. However, after losing 5–0 in early 2008 against the under-23 Argentine team, the Colombian soon departed. During 2010 World Cup qualifying, expectations of qualifying for the finals were set among the national team as Ramon Maradiaga returned as coach. They began well by advancing to the third round by defeating Saint Lucia 9–1 on aggregate.

In the third round, Guatemala began with a 1–0 home loss to the United States, with controversies surrounding the Panamanian referee Roberto Moreno, including not awarding a penalty to Guatemala in the first half after a handball from Steve Cherundolo, as well as Gustavo Cabrera being sent off after colliding with Eddie Lewis in the second half. In their second match, Los Chapines salvaged a draw in the closing minutes of the game against Trinidad and Tobago in Port of Spain after Carlos Gallardo deflected a free kick by Marco Pappa. On 10 September, Cuba shocked the Guatemalan supporters by taking the lead after Roberto Linares scored in the 25th minute, but by half-time, Carlos Ruiz had equalised, and in the second half, Ruiz scored again. Mario Rodríguez and José Manuel Contreras also scored and Guatemala won 4–1.

On 11 October, many fans gathered around the Estadio Mateo Flores for the game against Trinidad and Tobago. Despite being reduced to 10 men, the Soca Warriors were able to hold Guatemala to a 0–0 stalemate. Guatemala then lost in Cuba, falling behind 1–0 after Jaime Colome scored a penalty. Marco Pappa volleyed in an equalizer in the 80th minute, but Urgelles won the match for Cuba in the 90th minute. Meanwhile, the Trinidadians defeated the United States 2–1 at home, putting them in second place. Maradiaga was fired and Benjamin Monterroso was appointed, focusing on the Copa UNCAF the following January. A 2–0 away loss against the United States confirmed the elimination of the national team from the World Cup.

At the UNCAF nations cup, Monterroso wanted to introduce more youthful players into the starting line up such as Minor Lopez, Ricardo Jerez and Wilson Lalin, but Guatemala lost both group stage matches against Costa Rica and also lost 2–0 to Nicaragua in the play-off match for the final berth to attend the next Gold Cup; Minor Lopez was the lone goal scorer for Los Bicolores. As a result, the national team were inactive for the next two years and Monterroso stepped down after two months in charge.

2014 World Cup
In May 2010, the Uruguayan-born Paraguayan Ever Hugo Almeida was appointed as the Guatemala's next coach. At the 2011 Copa Centroamericana, formerly known as the "UNCAF Nations Cup", Guatemala finished in fifth place, losing 2–0 to Costa Rica and 3–1 Honduras before defeating Nicaragua 2–1 to qualify for the 2011 Gold Cup.

At the Gold Cup, Guatemala drew 0–0 against Honduras despite being reduced to nine men. They lost against a physically superior Jamaica 2–0, but managed to redeem themselves by beating Grenada 4–0, with goals from José Javier del Águila, Marco Pappa, Carlos Ruiz, and Carlos Gallardo. In the quarter-finals, they lost to 2–1 the reigning champions Mexico, after Ruiz had given them the lead in the first half.

For the 2014 World Cup qualifiers, Guatemala began in the second round with six wins in six games, advancing to a third round group alongside the United States, Jamaica and Antigua and Barbuda. Before the third round, three key players – Guillermo Ramirez, Gustavo Cabrera and Yony Flores – were sent home during a practice session after their team-mates Ruiz and Luis Rodriguez heard of their involvement in money laundering and bribery in fixing multiple fixtures; they were subsequently banned for life.

The team began with an away loss to Jamaica, with Dwight Pezzarossi only managing to pull back one goal in stoppage time. In the next match, Guatemala drew at home against the United States, with Marco Pappa's free kick salvaging a draw for the Guatemalans. At home against Antigua and Barbuda, Guatemala again fell behind, but after the Antiguan goalkeeper Molvin James was sent off for wasting time, Ruiz scored a brace and a goal from Pezzarossi sealed a 3–1 victory. Four days later, a goal from Ruiz sufficed for an away win against the same opponents in North Sound.

Guatemala beat Jamaica at home 2–1, leaving them needing a draw against the United States to progress to the final stage of the qualifiers. After they took the lead in the first five minutes thanks to Ruiz, the United States scored three unanswered goals, and Guatemala finished behind Jamaica on goal difference.

In January 2013, still led by Almeida, Guatemala participated in the 2013 Copa Centroamericana. With a team of mainly younger players, they could only manage three draws in their group play (1–1 against Nicaragua, 0–0 against Belize and 1–1 against Costa Rica), losing out to Belize for direct qualification for the 2013 Gold Cup. They faced Panama in the fifth place match, but lost 3–1, and Almeida stepped down in favour of the technical director, Victor Hugo Monzón.

2016 suspension
On October 28, 2016, the Guatemalan football federation was suspended indefinitely by FIFA, after the international football governing body had appointed an oversight committee to look into allegations of corruption. FIFA stated that the Guatemalan federation (FEDEFUT) had rejected the committee's mandate to run FEDEFUT's business, organize elections, and modernize its statutes, and would remain barred from international competition until FEDEFUT ratified an extension of the mandate.
The football team missed their chance on qualifying on the 2017 and 2019 CONCACAF Gold Cup tournaments (2017 Copa Centroamericana and 2019–20 CONCACAF Nations League qualifying) as they missed deadlines to have their suspension lifted.

The suspension was lifted on 31 May 2018 after FEDEFUT's normalization committee became fully operational.

Home stadium

The Estadio Nacional Mateo Flores, also known as Coloso de la Zona 5, is a multi-use national stadium in Guatemala City, the largest in Guatemala. It was built in 1948, to host the Central American and Caribbean Games in 1950, and was renamed after long-distance runner Mateo Flores, winner of the 1952 Boston Marathon. It has a capacity of 26,000 seats.

Used mostly for football matches, the stadium has hosted the majority of the home matches of the Guatemala national football team throughout its history.

Schedule and results

The following is a list of match results from the previous 12 months, as well as any future matches that have been scheduled.

2022

2023

Coaching history

Players

Current squad
 The following players were called up for the friendly match.
 Match dates: 19 November 2022
 Opposition: Caps and goals correct as of: 23 October 2022, after the match against .

Recent call-ups
The following players have been called up for the team in the last twelve months.

INJ Player withdrew from the squad due to an injury.
PRE Preliminary squad.
RET Player retired from the national team.
SUS Player is serving suspension.
WD Player withdrew from the squad due to non-injury issue.

Records

Players in bold are still active with Guatemala.

Most appearances

Most goals

Competitive record
FIFA World Cup

CONCACAF Gold Cup

CONCACAF Nations League

Copa Centroamericana

CCCF Championship

Olympic Games

Note: Football at the Summer Olympics has been an under-23 tournament since 1992.

Pan American Games

Note: Football at the Pan American Games has been an under-23 tournament since 1999.

Central American and Caribbean Games

Central American Games

Head-to-head record
 
As of 19 November 2022 after the match against .

HonoursMajor competitionsCONCACAF Championship Champions (1): 1967
 Runners-up (2): 1965, 1969Other competitionsCopa Centroamericana Champions (1): 2001
 Runners-up (5): 1995, 1997, 1999, 2003, 2014
 Third place (3): 1991, 2005, 2007CCCF Championship Runners-up (3): 1943, 1946, 1948
 Third place (1): 1953Central American and Caribbean Games Runners-up (1): 1950Pan American Games Bronze medal (1): 1983
 U.S. Cup Third place (1): 1999Marlboro Cup Champions (1):''' 1988

See also
 Guatemala national under-20 football team
 Guatemala national under-17 football team
 Liga Nacional de Guatemala

References

External links

 Official website 
 GuateFutbol.com 
 Guatemala FIFA profile

 
Central American national association football teams